Scott James Loach (born 27 May 1988) is an English professional footballer who plays as a goalkeeper for Derby County.

Loach previously played for Ipswich Town, Watford and Hartlepool United. He has also spent loan spells with non-League Stafford Rangers and York City, and Football League clubs Morecambe, Bradford City, Bury, Peterborough United, Yeovil Town and Notts County. He played for England at under-21 level and in August 2010 was called up to the senior squad for the first time.

Early and personal life
Loach was born in Nottingham, Nottinghamshire and grew up in Halstead, Essex.

Club career

Early career
Loach was a member of the academy at Ipswich Town from 1997 to 2000. Loach moved to Southwell, Nottinghamshire, attending Southwell Minster School and playing for local club Southwell United from 2002 to 2003. Loach joined Lincoln City's Centre of Excellence in April 2003, before signing a three-year scholarship in summer 2004.

In August 2004, he joined Bourne Town on loan, making two appearances. In October 2004, he played on loan for Radcliffe Olympic. He joined Boston Town in January 2005 on loan, which was extended until the end of the 2004–05 season, making 18 appearances. In August 2005, Loach was loaned to Spalding United. In November 2005, he had a one-match spell with Lincoln United. He returned to Boston Town later that month, before a period at Grantham Town in March 2006.

Watford

Despite not being offered professional terms at Lincoln City, Loach joined Watford in April 2006. He signed professional terms for Watford in June, with Lincoln City receiving a transfer fee of £50,000. In pre-season 2007 he was on trial at Leeds United with a view to a loan move. Although he played in several pre-season friendlies, the move did not come to fruition due to a transfer embargo as a result of Leeds entering administration.

In September 2007, Loach joined Conference Premier club Stafford Rangers on an initial one-month loan. It was later extended to three months, and Loach made 11 appearances for Stafford. He joined Morecambe on loan in January 2008, making his debut on 1 January in a 2–1 defeat to Stockport County. He made only one more league appearance for Morecambe, during which he saved a penalty from Macclesfield Town's Martin Gritton, before he returning to Watford after just two weeks. At the end of the month he joined Bradford City, another League Two club, on loan until the end of 2007–08 as replacement for Donovan Ricketts, who was expected to move to Queens Park Rangers until he was refused a work permit. Loach made his debut a day after joining Bradford, conceding twice in their 4–2 victory over Shrewsbury Town. He followed it up five days later with a clean sheet against Macclesfield Town after he saved a second penalty at Moss Rose in as many months. Loach played the remainder of the season with Bradford, making 20 appearances for the club, who finished in 10th place in League Two.

Loach returned to Watford and made his debut in the 1–0 League Cup win over Bristol Rovers. He made his league debut as a substitute on 20 September 2008 when he came on to replace Mart Poom in the fourth minute of a match against Reading. Loach conceded his first Watford goal when the referee and linesman gave a goal instead of a corner, an incident described as a ghost goal. The match finished in a 2–2 draw. Loach remained a regular in the Watford team for the rest of 2008–09, under the management of Aidy Boothroyd, Malky Mackay and later Brendan Rodgers.

In August 2009, FourFourTwo magazine said Loach was the 'Key Player' in Watford's season and that fans should expect a good season from the young goalkeeper. Newspaper reports linked Loach to Tottenham Hotspur as backup to Heurelho Gomes, however as Carlo Cudicini's alleged move to Portsmouth did not go through, no deal was ever made. Loach made a good start to 2009–10 including a match winning performance against Plymouth where Watford won 1–0. Loach featured in all 46 Watford league matches that season, and on 5 March 2010 extended his contract with Watford until 2013.

Loach retained his place in the team for 2010–11, and once again played all 46 league fixtures. However, he subsequently admitted that his form had dipped towards the end of that season. After 130 consecutive league appearances, Loach missed a Championship match for the first time since 2008 on 27 September 2011. He regained the place from Rene Gilmartin a few weeks later. Loach remained in the team until 18 February 2012, when he was replaced by loan player Tomasz Kuszczak. Loach returned to the Watford team on their final day of 2011–12, in their 2–1 win against Middlesbrough.

Ipswich Town
Loach completed what he called his "dream move" by returning to his boyhood club for an undisclosed fee on 19 July 2012. He made his debut on 14 August in a 3–1 win against Bristol Rovers in the League Cup. He kept his first clean sheet in a 1–0 win against former club Watford on 21 August.

Ipswich released Loach following 2013–14 where he had been replaced in the first team by Dean Gerken, having made only 33 appearances for Ipswich.

Rotherham United
Loach signed for newly promoted Championship club Rotherham United on 5 June 2014. On 10 November 2014, after only having made four appearances for Rotherham, Loach was loaned out to League One club Bury until 17 January 2015.

On 2 March 2015, following an injury to Artur Krysiak, Loach joined League One club Yeovil Town on a one-month emergency loan.

Notts County

On 15 July 2015, Loach signed for newly relegated League Two club Notts County on a two-year contract.

On 23 March 2017, Loach joined National League club York City on loan until the end of 2016–17, to replace the injured Kyle Letheren. He made his debut two days later, starting in a 1–0 away defeat to Dagenham & Redbridge. Loach remained in goal after Letheren returned to fitness, making nine appearances. His final appearance came in a 2–2 home draw with Forest Green Rovers on 29 April 2017, which saw York relegated to the National League North with a 21st-place finish in the National League. He returned to Notts County after this match, as he was not eligible to play for York in the 2017 FA Trophy Final. He was subsequently released by Notts County, and ruled out joining York permanently.

Hartlepool United
On 9 June 2017, Loach signed for newly relegated National League club Hartlepool United. At the end of the 2017–18 season, Loach won both Fans Player and Players' Player of the Year Awards.

He also won the Players' Player of the Year Award in the 2018–19 season.
Loach played his 100th consecutive appearance in all competitions for Hartlepool during their 3–2 victory over Salford City in April 2019.

At the end of the 2018–19 season, Loach left Hartlepool following the expiry of his contract.

Barnet
Loach signed for National League club Barnet on 14 June 2019. He played 72 times in two seasons before leaving the club at the end of the 2020-21 season.

Chesterfield
On 11 June 2021, Loach joined fellow National League club Chesterfield.

Derby County
On 13 July 2022, Loach joined League One club Derby County on a free transfer.

International career
In February 2009, Loach's good form at club level earned him his first England under-21 international call-up by manager Stuart Pearce for a friendly match against Ecuador's senior team in Malaga. Loach made his international debut when he came on as a late replacement for Tom Heaton, as England lost 3–2.

In May 2009, Loach was named in the England Under-21 squad for the Under-21 Championships that take place in Sweden in June 2009. He only played in one match as Joe Hart was first choice. He started in goal for England in the 4–0 defeat to Germany in the final of the Under-21 Championships in place of the suspended Hart and was highly culpable for the second German goal. With Hart and Joe Lewis ineligible for the under-21s, Loach began to play regularly thereafter.

On 10 August 2010, after Ben Foster and Paul Robinson withdrew from the squad, Loach received his first call up to the full England squad for the friendly against Hungary. The following month, after Scott Carson withdrew from the England squad due to a bereavement, he received a second call up to the full England squad for the Euro 2012 qualifiers against Bulgaria and Switzerland.

Career statistics

Honours
England U21
UEFA European Under-21 Championship runner-up: 2009

Individual
Hartlepool United Player of the Year: 2017–18
Hartlepool United Players' Player of the Year: 2017–18
Hartlepool United Players' Player of the Year: 2018–19

References

External links

Profile at the Barnet F.C. website

1988 births
Living people
Footballers from Nottingham
People from Halstead
Sportspeople from Essex
People from Southwell, Nottinghamshire
Footballers from Nottinghamshire
English footballers
England under-21 international footballers
England semi-pro international footballers 
Association football goalkeepers
Ipswich Town F.C. players
Lincoln City F.C. players
Bourne Town F.C. players
Radcliffe Olympic F.C. players
Boston Town F.C. players
Spalding United F.C. players
Lincoln United F.C. players
Grantham Town F.C. players
Watford F.C. players
Stafford Rangers F.C. players
Morecambe F.C. players
Bradford City A.F.C. players
Rotherham United F.C. players
Bury F.C. players
Peterborough United F.C. players
Yeovil Town F.C. players
Notts County F.C. players
York City F.C. players
Hartlepool United F.C. players
Barnet F.C. players
Chesterfield F.C. players
Derby County F.C. players
United Counties League players
Northern Premier League players
Southern Football League players
National League (English football) players
English Football League players
People educated at Southwell Minster School